Shalunov is a Russian masculine surname, its feminine counterpart is Shalunova. Notable people with the surname include:

Evgeny Shalunov (born 1992), Russian bicycle racer
Maxim Shalunov (born 1993), Russian ice hockey player 

Russian-language surnames